The 1918 Richmond Spiders football team was an American football team that represented Richmond College—now known as the University of Richmond—as a member of the South Atlantic Intercollegiate Athletic Association (SAIAA) during the 1918 college football season. Led by Robert C. Marshall in his first and only year as head coach, Richmond compiled an overall record of 3–1–1 with a mark of 1–0 in conference play. Richmond beat rival William & Mary, 7–0.

Schedule

References

Richmond
Richmond Spiders football seasons
Richmond Spiders football